Troilus is a genus of shield bugs in the family Pentatomidae. There are at least two described species in Troilus.

Some species of this genus are found in Europe.

Species
These species belong to the genus Troilus:
 Troilus luridus (Fabricius, 1775) g palearctic distribution
 Troilus maracaja Bernardes, Schwertner & Grazia, 2011 g
 Troilus testaceus Zheng & Liu, 1987 from Yunnan, China
Data sources: i = ITIS, c = Catalogue of Life, g = GBIF, b = Bugguide.net

References

Further reading

 
 
 

Pentatomidae